Guangzhou Twin Towers are two skyscrapers in Guangzhou, Guangdong. They are the two tallest skyscrapers in the city.

The West Tower, Guangzhou International Finance Center, was designed by Wilkinson Eyre and the East Tower, Guangzhou Chow Tai Fook Finance Centre, by Kohn Pedersen Fox. Both towers are located at Zhujiang New Town, the city's central business district, in Tianhe District. The West Tower became operational in 2010 and the East Tower opened in 2016.

External links

Guangzhou Twin Towers from Emporis

References

Twin towers
Skyscrapers in Guangzhou